The 2017–18 James Madison Dukes men's basketball team represented James Madison University during the 2017–18 NCAA Division I men's basketball season. The Dukes, led by second-year head coach Louis Rowe, played their home games at the James Madison University Convocation Center in Harrisonburg, Virginia as members of the Colonial Athletic Association. They finished the season 10–22, 6–12 in CAA play to finish in a four-way tie for seventh place. They lost in the first round of the CAA tournament to Drexel.

Previous season 
The Dukes finished the 2016–17 season 10–23, 7–11 record in CAA play to finish in a tie for third place. The Dukes lost in the quarterfinals of CAA tournament to College of Charleston. The season was the first for head coach Louis Rowe.

Offseason

Departures

Incoming transfers

2017 recruiting class

Roster

Schedule and results

|-
!colspan=9 style=| Non-conference regular season

|-
!colspan=9 style=| Exhibition

|-
!colspan=9 style=| CAA regular season

|-
!colspan=9 style=| CAA tournament

References

James Madison Dukes men's basketball seasons
James Madison
James Madison